Marasmius semiustus is a species of fungus in the family Marasmiaceae. It is a plant pathogen responsible for banana plant disease commonly found in the West Indies. The only known remedy is the removal and burning of diseased plants.

This fungus is also found in Malaysia, Hawaii, Taiwan, and Costa Rica. It was first described scientifically in 1869.

References 

Fungi of Asia
Fungi of Central America
Fungi described in 1869
Fungal plant pathogens and diseases
Banana diseases
semiustus
Taxa named by Miles Joseph Berkeley